The 10th Lugano Trophy was a junior competition held in Lugano, Switzerland on May 18, 2013. The men's all-around winner was Christian Baumann of Switzerland and the women's all around winner was Andreea Munteanu of Romania.

Medal winners

Women's Individual all-around

References

Lugano Trophy,10